Charpentiera is a flowering plant genus in the family Amaranthaceae. It consists of five species endemic to Hawaii, where they are known as pāpala, and one species found only on the island of Tubuai in the Austral Islands. The genus is named for Arsène Charpentier (1781-1818), professor of pharmacy at Antwerp from 1810 to 1814 and at Cherbourg from 1814 to 1816.

Species
Charpentiera australis  (Tubuai)
Charpentiera densiflora Sohmer (Kauai)
Charpentiera elliptica (Hillebr.) A.Heller (Kauai)
Charpentiera obovata Gaudich. (main islands of Hawaii)
Charpentiera ovata Gaudich. (Oahu, Molokai, Maui, island of Hawaii)
Charpentiera tomentosa Sohmer
Charpentiera tomentosa var. maakuaensis (Oahu)
Charpentiera tomentosa var. tomentosa (Oahu, Molokai, Lānai, Maui, island of Hawaii)

Uses
Native Hawaiians on the northwest coast of the island of Kauai used lightweight pāpala branches in the art of ōahi.  Branches were ignited and tossed off of high sea cliffs, where they were buoyed by ridge lifts and burned like fireworks.

References

Amaranthaceae
Amaranthaceae genera
Trees of Hawaii
Endemic flora of Hawaii